Asciano is a comune and hill town in the province of Siena in the Italian region Tuscany.

History
Asciano has origins as Etruscan, Roman and Lombard settlements. A 5th century BC Etruscan necropolis has been excavated nearby and remains of Roman baths, with a fine mosaic pavement   were found within the town in 1898. During the medieval period its location made it a site of contest between Siena and Florence: the battle of Montaperti was fought in the nearby on 4 September 1260. The village was purchased by the Sienese in 1285 and surrounded by walls in 1351, and has some 14th-century churches with paintings of the same period.

Main sights
Asciano has the 11th century Romanesque basilica of Sant'Agata which was built of travertine. The church, with its aisleless nave topped by a truss roof, is adorned with decorative elements of the Lombard type. Outside is its 13th century campanile. The interior houses two 16th-century frescoes, one by Il Sodoma and a Pietà attributed to Bartolomeo Neroni.

Adjoining the church is the Museo d'Arte Sacra where works by painters in the Sienese manner of the 14th and 15th centuries are exhibited. The Museo Archeologico contains finds from the excavation of chamber tombs from the cemetery of Poggio Pinci.

10 kilometers (6 mi) to the south is the large Benedictine monastery of Monte Oliveto Maggiore, mother-house of the Olivetans and founded in 1320. The cloister is famous for the series of frescoes illustrating scenes from the legend of St. Benedict begun by Luca Signorelli and completed by il Sodoma in 1505. The latter master's work is perhaps nowhere better represented than here. The church contains fine inlaid choir stalls by Fra Giovanni da Verona. The monastery is described by Pope Pius II in his Commentaria.

Neighbouring comuni
Buonconvento, Castelnuovo Berardenga, Monteroni d'Arbia, Rapolano Terme, San Giovanni d'Asso, Siena, Sinalunga, Trequanda

Frazioni
The municipality is formed by the municipal seat of Asciano and the towns and villages (frazioni) of Arbia, Castelnuovo Scalo, Chiusure, Torre a Castello. Other notable villages include Calceno, Campana, Camparboli, Casabianca, Casanova Pansarine, Castelnuovo Grilli, Collanza, Grania, Leonina, Medane, Monselvoli, Montalceto, Montauto, Montebaroni, Montecalvoli, Montecerconi, Montecontieri, Montemori, Monte Oliveto Maggiore, Monte Sante Marie, Mucigliani, Pievina, Poggio Pinci, San Martino in Grania, San Vito and Vescona.

References

Sources

 
Crete Senesi